Castle Hill may refer to:

Places

Australia

 Castle Hill, a small hill and land area in Bicton, Western Australia
Castle Hill, New South Wales, a suburb of Sydney
 Castle Hill, Queensland, a suburb of Townsville
Castle Hill, Townsville, a granite monolith

United Kingdom

England
 Castle Hill, Alwinton, an Iron Age hillfort in Northumberland
 Castle Hill, Brighton, a Site of Special Scientific Interest near Brighton, East Sussex
 Castle Hill, Cambridge, a hill and street in Cambridge
 Castle Hill, Chessington, a Local Nature Reserve in London
 Castle Hill, Dudley Castle, West Midlands
 Castle Hill, East Sussex, in the parish of Rotherfield
 Castle Hill, Englefield Green, Surrey
 Castle Hill, Filleigh, a privately owned Palladian House in North Devon
 Castle Hill, Folkestone, a hill on the North Downs near Folkestone, Kent
 Castle Hill, Hampshire, Iron Age fortification the New Forest in Hampshire
 Castle Hill, Huddersfield, in the county of West Yorkshire in England
 Castle Hill, Malvern Hills, in the parish of Wichenford
 Castle Hill, Mere, in Wiltshire, England
 Castle Hill, Oxfordshire, part of Wittenham Clumps
 Castle Hill, Rattray, Devon
 Castle Hill, Stockport, Greater Manchester
 Castle Hill, Ipswich, Suffolk, an area of Ipswich
 Castle Hill Ward, Ipswich
 Great Ashfield Castle, Suffolk, England
 Castle Hill, Thetford, an earthwork fortification in Thetford, Norfolk
 Castle Hill, Torrington, Iron Age earthworks and hill fort in Devon
 Castle Hill, Tunbridge Wells, in the parish of Brenchley
 Castle Hill, Winchester, Council Chamber for Hampshire County Council
 Castle Hill, Wolverley, Worcestershire

Scotland
 Castle Hill, Caprington, East Ayrshire.
 Castlehill, Dumbarton, in Scotland
 Castlehill, Edinburgh
 Castlehill, Perth and Kinross, a location
 Castlehill, South Ayrshire, a location
 Castlehill, Scottish Borders, a location
 Castlehill Fort, the Roman Fort on the Antonine Wall in Scotland, near Bearsden

Wales
Castle Hill, Ceredigion

Ireland
Castle Hill, Kerry, 600 m peak in Slieve Mish Mountains
 Castlehill, County Mayo, a village in County Mayo, Ireland

United States

 Castle Hill (Sitka, Alaska), an archaeological site
 Castle Hill, California, a census-designated place
 Castle Hill, Maine, a town in Aroostook County
 Castle Hill (Ipswich, Massachusetts), a historic house
 Castle Hill, Bronx, New York, a neighborhood in New York City
 Castle Hill Light, Newport, Rhode Island, a historic lighthouse and inn
 Castle Hill (Virginia), a historic plantation in Albemarle County
 Castle Hills, Texas, a small city in Bexar County

Other countries

 Castle Hill, Antigua and Barbuda, on the island of Barbuda
 Castle Hill, Newfoundland and Labrador, Canada
 Castle Hill (Buda), the oldest part of the Hungarian capital
 Castle Hill, New Zealand
 Castle Hill, Ljubljana, Slovenia, the location of the Ljubljana Castle
 Linnanmäki (Castle Hill), an amusement park in Helsinki, Finland
 Zamkova Hora (Kyiv) (Castle Hill), Kyiv, Ukraine

Ships
, a British cargo ship in service 1949-50

See also
 Schlossberg (disambiguation), for a number of articles named Castle Hill in German
Castle on the Hill (disambiguation)
Castle Mound (disambiguation)